Mardonwali Baat  is a 1988 Bollywood action film starring Dharmendra, Shabana Azmi, Sanjay Dutt, Jaya Prada in lead roles. The music was composed by R. D. Burman. The film flopped, according to Trade Guide 1988's annual list.

Plot 
Yadvinder Singh and his brother Tinku are career criminals in Mumbai. One day, they receive a letter from a blackmailer, who claims that there is an evidence that can send them to jail for a long time unless and until they go to a village named Kashipur and protect a boy named Rahul and other villagers from being killed by a gang of bandits led by Raja Sunder Singh. With the fear of being apprehended by the police, the duo decide to follow the blackmailer's instructions. They travel to Kashipur and tell the villagers that they are police officers in casuals sent to protect them against bandits. The simple-minded villagers accept this explanation, and both are accepted into the community. They find out that Rahul knows of a truck that contains millions of rupees of arms and ammunition, and it is for this reason that Raja Sunder Singh has been threatening them.

Cast 
 Dharmendra as Yadvinder Singh
 Shabana Azmi as Seema
 Sanjay Dutt as Tinku
 Jaya Prada as Asha
 Deven Verma as Chhaila
 Danny Denzongpa as Raja Sundar Singh
 Satish Kaul as Inspector Deepak
 Priti Sapru as Ketki

Music

External links 
 

1988 films
1980s Hindi-language films
Films scored by R. D. Burman
Films directed by Brij Sadanah